The Chess World Cup 2009 was a 128-player single-elimination tournament, played between 20 November and 14 December 2009, in Khanty-Mansiysk, Russia. The Cup winner qualified for the Candidates stage of the World Chess Championship 2012.  Boris Gelfand defeated Ruslan Ponomariov in the final.

The winner of the Chess World Cup 2007, Gata Kamsky, was defeated by Wesley So in the third round.

Format
Matches consisted of two games (except for the final, which consisted of four).  Players had 90 minutes for the first 40 moves followed by 30 minutes for the rest of the game with an addition of 30 seconds per move from move one. If the match was tied after the regular games, tie breaks were played on the next day. The format for the tie breaks was as follows:
 Four rapid games (25 minutes plus 10 second increment) were played. According to chess journalist Mig Greengard, a "high FIDE official" admitted off the record that this unusual decision of playing four games instead of two was actually a mistake that was spotted too late to correct it.
 If the score was still tied, up to five pairs of blitz games (5 minutes plus 3 second increment) were played. If one player led after a pair of blitz games, that player was declared the winner. This was a change from previous events, for instance at the Chess World Cup 2007 the match went to an armageddon game after a single pair of blitz games.
 If the score was still tied after five pairs of blitz games, a single armageddon game (white must win, black only needs to draw) would be played. White had 5 minutes, black had 4 minutes, and both players had three-second increments beginning with move 61. Ultimately, no Armageddon games were played, as all matches were decided before that stage.

Participants
The players qualified for the event were:

 , 2758 (R)
 , 2758 (R)
 , 2754 (R)
 , 2750 (R)
 , 2748 (R)
 , 2739 (R)
 , 2739 (R)
 , 2736 (R)
 , 2736 (R)
 , 2734 (R)
 , 2729 (E09)
 , 2723 (SF)
 , 2719 (R)
 , 2719 (SF)
 , 2719 (R)
 , 2718 (E08)
 , 2718 (E08)
 , 2715 (R)
 , 2708 (E09)
 , 2708 (R)
 , 2707 (E09)
 , 2706 (R)
 , 2700 (R)
 , 2697 (R)
 , 2696 (E09)
 , 2695 (E09)
 , 2695 (SF)
 , 2694 (E09)
 , 2692 (E08)
 , 2689 (E09)
 , 2682 (R)
 , 2680 (R)
 , 2677 (E09)
 , 2676 (E08)
 , 2672 (Z2.1)
 , 2671 (PN)
 , 2668 (E08)
 , 2666 (E08)
 , 2666 (E08)
 , 2664 (E08)
 , 2664 (E09)
 , 2664 (R)
 , 2662 (E08)
 , 2655 (E08)
 , 2654 (AS)
 , 2653 (Z2.4)
 , 2653 (E08)
 , 2653 (E09)
 , 2652 (E08)
 , 2652 (PN)
 , 2652 (E09)
 , 2652 (R)
 , 2651 (E09)
 , 2645 (E09)
 , 2644 (E09)
 , 2643 (E09)
 , 2642 (PN)
 , 2642 (E08)
 , 2640 (Z3.3)
 , 2640 (AM09)
 , 2637 (E08)
 , 2636 (E08)
 , 2634 (E09)
 , 2631 (Z3.4)

 , 2629 (E08)
 , 2629 (Z3.5)
 , 2628 (E08)
 , 2628 (E08)
 , 2626 (E09)
 , 2625 (E09)
 , 2624 (Z2.1)
 , 2624 (AS)
 , 2623 (AS)
 , 2623 (Z2.1)
 , 2622 (E08)
 , 2621 (Z2.4)
 , 2620 (AS)
 , 2619 (E09)
 , 2619 (Z2.3)
 , 2618 (E09)
 , 2615 (E09)
 , 2612 (E09)
 , 2612 (E08)
 , 2607 (Z3.4)
 , 2606 (AM09)
 , 2606 (AM08)
 , 2606 (E08)
 , 2605 (AM09)
 , 2605 (Z2.3)
 , 2603 (PN)
 , 2603 (AS)
 , 2603 (AM09)
 , 2602 (E08)
 , 2602 (AM09)
 , 2596 (Z3.5)
 , 2591 (E09)
 , 2590 (E08)
 , 2589 (PN)
 , 2588 (AS)
 , 2583 (J07)
 , 2578 (J08)
 , 2574 (AS)
 , 2572 (Z2.1)
 , 2567, IM (PN)
 , 2562 (Z2.5)
 , 2561 (E09)
 , 2553 (AF)
 , 2552 (Z3.3)
 , 2551 (Z2.1)
 , 2539 (AM09)
 , 2533, IM (ON)
 , 2529 (AS)
 , 2527 (AS)
 , 2525 (Z3.6)
 , 2522 (AS)
 , 2516 (WWC)
 , 2508 (Z2.5)
 , 2504 (Z3.1)
 , 2501 (ON)
 , 2500 (AF)
 , 2497, IM (Z3.2)
 , 2493 (AF)
 , 2484 (ON)
 , 2472, IM (AF)
 , 2469, IM (AF)
 , 2420, IM (Z2.2)
 , 2405, IM (AF)
 , 2404, IM (ON)

All players are grandmasters unless indicated otherwise. The pairings of the 1st round (players were seeded according to their ratings) were announced on 2 November 2009, immediately after the publishing of the November rating list. The list of players who declined participation: Anand, Carlsen, Topalov, Aronian, Kramnik, Leko, Adams, Nakamura, and Ni Hua. Among them, Anand, Topalov and Aronian had already qualified for the Candidates or the Championship match; Carlsen, Kramnik, Nakamura, Adams and Ni had committed to play in the London Chess Classic on 7–15 December 2009.

Qualification paths:

SF: Semi-finalist of Chess World Cup 2007
WWC: Women's World Champion
J07 and J08: World Junior Champions 2007 and 2008
R: Rating (average of July 2008 and January 2009 ratings is used)
E08 and E09: European Individual Championships 2008 and 2009
AM08: Pan American Chess Championship 2008

AM09: Continental Absolute Chess Championship Americas 2009
AS: Asian Chess Championship 2009
AF: African Chess Championship 2009
Z2.1, Z2.2, Z2.3, Z2.4, Z2.5, Z3.1, Z3.2, Z3.3, Z3.4, Z3.5, Z3.6: Zonal tournaments
PN: FIDE president nominee
ON: Organizer nominee

Calendar

Summary of results

Round one
In the first round of the tournament all of the top 30 seeded players progressed, with the sole exception of Slovakian Sergei Movsesian (16), who was eliminated by the Chinese 113th seed Yu Yangyi. Judit Polgár achieved a walkover, due to her opponent Duško Pavasovič withdrawing from the competition due to injury. The round was notable for the 16-game match between Pavel Tregubov and Varuzhan Akobian: after each winning with white over the first two days, their tiebreak held a marathon of four rapid games followed by ten blitz games. The two players fought until near 1 a.m. local time for the right to face Ruslan Ponomariov in the second round (which would start the next morning), Akobian finally achieving the decisive two-point advantage in the final bout before an Armageddon game would have been required.

Round two
The first day of Round Two included a number of upsets. The highest seed to have won their match was Alexander Grischuk (8), as Peter Svidler (3), Alexander Morozevich (4),  Teimour Radjabov (5) and Vassily Ivanchuk (6) all lost and the remaining highest seeds (Gelfand, Gashimov and Ponomariov) drew. On the next day of matches, Morozevich, Radjabov and Ivanchuk were all eliminated, and exactly half of the matches went to tie-breaks. Of the 32 players to reach Round Three, all but seven players had been originally seeded in the top 32.

Round three
Sixteen-year-old Wesley So, who had upset Ivanchuk in Round Two, achieved another major upset, defeating Gata Kamsky, the 2007 winner, 1½-½. In the second rapid tiebreak, Chinese players Wang Yue and Li Chao were not at their seats for the start of the round, and lost the game, and their matches against Bacrot and Gashimov.

Round four
This round marked the departure of most of the youthful players from the World Cup. Wesley So (16), Fabiano Caruana (17) and Maxime Vachier-Lagrave (19) were eliminated by the more experienced Malakhov, Gashimov and Gelfand respectively, leaving Sergey Karjakin the only under-20 player left in contention.

Results, rounds 1–4

Section 1

Section 2

Section 3

Section 4

Section 5

Section 6

Section 7

Section 8

Results, rounds 5–7

Final, 10–14 December

References

External links
World Cup 2009 – Official site

2009
World Cup
World Cup
Sport in Khanty-Mansiysk
2009 in Russian sport
International sports competitions hosted by Russia